"happiness!!!" is a song Japanese pop singer Kaela Kimura, released as the second single from her debut album, Kaela, on October 27, 2004. It peaked at number eleven on the Japan Oricon singles chart.

Track listing
"happiness!!!"
"untie"
"happiness!!!" (Instrumental)
"untie" (Instrumental)

References

2004 singles
Kaela Kimura songs
Japanese-language songs
Songs written by Kaela Kimura
2004 songs